Micropterix lambesiella is a species of moth belonging to the family Micropterigidae. It was described by Viette in 1949. It is known from north-eastern Algeria.

The wingspan is 4.2-4.5 mm.

References

Micropterigidae
Moths described in 1949
Endemic fauna of Algeria
Moths of Africa